Absolute Power is the fourth studio album by American rapper Tech N9ne from Kansas City, Missouri, and is officially his first album released on Strange Music. Production was handled by several record producers, including Reuben 'Bonyx' Armstrong, RonnZfromBerlin and 5150 Mental Productions. It features guest appearances from 57th Street Rogue Dog Villains, D12, Krizz Kaliko, Kutt Calhoun, Skatterman & Snug Brim among others.

The album peaked at number 79 on the Billboard 200.

The hook for the song I'm A Playa samples and is inspired by the song Rock Me Amadeus by Falco.

Track listing

Charts

Certifications

References

External links

2002 albums
Tech N9ne albums
Horrorcore albums
Strange Music albums